"Thubway Tham's Baggage Check" is a short story written by Johnston McCulley. It first appeared in Detective Story Magazine on March 25, 1919.

External links

American short stories
1919 short stories
Crime short stories
Works originally published in Detective Story Magazine